Shanto Iyengar is an American political scientist and professor of political science at Stanford University. He is also the Harry & Norman Chandler Professor of Communication at Stanford, the director of Stanford's Political Communication Lab, and a senior fellow at the Hoover Institution.

Biography
Iyengar received his bachelor's degree from Linfield College in 1968 and his Ph.D. from the University of Iowa in 1972. In 1973, he joined the faculty of Kansas State University as an assistant professor, where he remained until 1979. He taught at Yale University as an assistant professor from 1983 to 1985, and then taught at Stony Brook University and the University of California, Los Angeles before joining Stanford's faculty in 1998.

Research
Iyengar is known for his work on the role of the news media in contemporary politics. This includes work he conducted with Dartmouth College political scientist Sean J. Westwood, in which they analyze partisan divisions in American politics.

References

External links

Living people
American political scientists
Stanford University faculty
Linfield University alumni
University of Iowa alumni
Kansas State University faculty
Yale University faculty
University of California, Los Angeles faculty
Stony Brook University faculty
Hoover Institution people
Year of birth missing (living people)
Political psychologists